Love Party (PdA) was a political party in Italy co-founded on 12 July 1991, by pornstars Moana Pozzi and Ilona Staller, the latter a member of the Chamber of Deputies.

Political line
The party was organized by Riccardo Schicchi, Cicciolina's manager, as a parody of the traditional political parties. However, it was later identified as a counterculture movement by exponents Mauro Biuzzi and Marcella Zingarini.

Elections
After a brief alliance with Carlo Fatuzzo's Pensioner's Party, Pozzi ran unsuccessfully for the parliament at the general election in 1992. In 1993, Pozzi ran for the Mayor of Rome.

See also
 Australian Sex Party

References

External links
 Party website

Defunct political parties in Italy
Free love
Joke political parties in Italy
Political parties established in 1991
1991 establishments in Italy
Libertarianism in Italy